Alvinella pompejana, the Pompeii worm, is a species of deep-sea polychaete worm (commonly referred to as "bristle worms"). It is an extremophile found only at hydrothermal vents in the Pacific Ocean, discovered in the early 1980s off the Galápagos Islands by French marine biologists.

Introduction
In 1980 Daniel Desbruyères and Lucien Laubier, just few years after the discovery of the first hydrothermal vent system, identified one of the most heat-tolerant animals on Earth — Alvinella pompejana, the Pompeii worm. It was described as a deep-sea polychaete that resides in tubes near hydrothermal vents, along the seafloor. In 1997, marine biologist Craig Cary and colleagues found the same worms in a new section of Pacific Ocean, near Costa Rica, also attached to hydrothermal vents. The new discovery and subsequent work led to important progress in the scientific knowledge of these special worms.

Scientists are attempting to understand how Pompeii worms can withstand such extreme temperatures by studying the bacteria that form a "fleece-like" covering on their backs. The bacteria have also been discovered to be chemolithotrophic, contributing to the ecology of the vent community. Recent research suggests the bacteria might play an important role in the feeding of the worms.

Biology
Glands on the worm's back secrete a mucus on which the bacteria feed, a form of symbiosis. The Pompeii worms form large, aggregate colonies enclosed in long tubes.

Alvinella pompejana has relatively simple organ systems centering around its rod-like heart. Its outermost organ is the gills along its feather-shaped head, four external gills present as leaf-like structures with a red colour due to their haemoglobin. The heart provides blood to these organs using contractions, pushing blood along the dorsal and ventral vessels. Beneath the heart lies the animal's stomach which connects to an oesophagus that is used to consume food. Finally, surrounding the organs is a coelom filled with coelomocytes, a type of phagocyte that acts as an immune system for the animal.

The Pompeii Worm feeds upon chemosynthetic bacteria, using retractable, ciliated feeding tentacles to scoop them up or absorbing their organic matter within the hydrothermal vent fluid. These tentacles are coated with 4 types of secretory cells along the entire epidermis. The tentacle’s muscle cells seem to be filled with homogenous blood cells and individual hat-shaped cells, the hat-shaped cells have a condensed nucleus and it is hypothesised that these are heavily modified sperm cells.

The gills of A. pompejana are pinnate with many thin outgrowths. This organ is ultrastructurally similar to the gills of terebellidae and the epidermis is irregularly folded inwards. This gives the blood access to a space very close to the skin of A. pompejana, thus allowing more effective oxygen diffusion. Secretory cells of the goblet type have also been observed, along with hairlike receptor cells known as bipolar ciliary receptor cells. It is important to note that the Pompeii worm’s epibiotic bacteria are absent from both the gills and tentacles.

Physiology 
Alvinella pompejana’s blood is abnormally cool at 20-30°C. This is due to their blood's high positive cooperativity at these temperatures, thus haemoglobin is more likely to gain oxygen, an essential feature in an environment with sparse oxygen levels. Additionally, A. pompejana's gills have the highest specific surface area of any polychaete and small diffusion distances between the circulatory system and external seawater further assist in oxygenation.

Alvinellidae have an exceptionally high congenital oxygen affinity and high heat is needed for oxygenation (𝚫H), to allow adequate release of oxygen within the body, the Pompeii worm has acidic blood with a pH range of 6.6-6.9. A lower pH decreases the energy required to unbind oxygen from haemoglobin by utilising the bohr effect. The effect gradually compounds as the haemoglobin’s 4 O2 binding sites are emptied, it is maximal when the haemoglobin is fully deoxygenated. As a result, they can release all possible oxygen without expending excessive energy. To further compound this, A. pompejana’s vascular haemoglobin has a lower oxygen affinity when compared to coelomic haemoglobin. When it is time to rebind oxygen to the haemoglobin, the blood must be cooled to 20-30°C to regain optimal cooperativity. However, hydrothermal vents reach much higher temperatures. This makes the low blood temperature strange and seemingly hard to maintain.

The current hypothesis is that the polychaete worm somehow maintains an “external microenvironment” that does not exceed this 20-30°C limit. This is supported by evidence that A. pompejana’s mitochondrion break down when 30°C is exceeded. Despite this the worm still manages to live in vents that exceed 50°C. Furthermore, an inverse relationship is drawn between 𝚫H value and the temperature range of an environment; a higher 𝚫H means a habitat has a smaller range of temperatures with fewer fluctuations. As A. pompejana has a high 𝚫H it is reasonable to theorise that their habitable temperature range is quite small with few fluctuations.

Reproduction 
Alvinella pompejana are a gonochoric species with distinct differences between the male and female genital pores (located at the base of the gills). Males have a pair of tentacles near the mouth that are absent in females. However, females possess a genital tract consisting of oviducts and spermathecae. The exact method of reproduction is unknown but it is believed that it is a complex multi-step process. However, it is known that the Pompeii worm's habitat rapidly changes and is extremely unstable, and thus their reproduction has adapted accordingly. 

The size of the female oocytes suggests that the embryo is lecithotrophic meaning the only nutrition is within the yolk of the egg. Prior to fertilisation these oocytes are flattened spheres with an undulating membrane and a slightly off centre germinal vesicle that is less dense than the surrounding cytoplasm. Upon dilution in seawater, they become spherical and the GV disappears, at this point the whole oocyte appears homogeneous. This process does not require sperm.

The current hypothesis for egg synthesis and spawning is as follows: first the yolk is formed through a long process within the animal's coelom, next, the mature eggs are stored and finally, the eggs are spawned when either an environmental or biological change occurs (eg. sperm transfer). The method for transfer of spermatozoa it is likely achieved through pseudo-copulatory behaviour as the worms have been observed diving head-first into tubes in a display that may be mating. 

When it is deemed appropriate to fertilise the eggs they are seemingly selected based upon size and then individually passed through the spermathecae. This method of fertilisation is more efficient than having all eggs be passed through at once.

Between 30 minutes and several hours after fertilisation has been achieved, the fertilisation envelope progressively elevates. This begins at a single point along the periphery of the oocyte. Then, prior to the first cleavage, a polar lobe forms thus resulting in asymmetrical cleavages. The diameter ratio between the asymmetrical blastomeres remains fairly constant (1:1.5) with "4 cell" embryos typically possessing 1 cell bigger than the other 3. This is a similar to the pattern observed in other polychaetes.

Early Development 
Although in situ observations are yet to be made of Alvinella pompejana’s early development, experiments have been conducted in order to hypothesise the embryonic and early stages of this polychaete's life.

Embryos of the Pompeii Worm are unable to tolerate both low and high temperatures, only developing in temperatures higher than 2°C and lower than 20°C. At 2°C, the temperature of the abyssal sea, embryos enter a state of arrested development and at 20°C the embryos die. Thus, they must not develop in hydrothermal vent colonies as temperatures much higher than 20°C are achieved in this habitat.

Both in vitro and in situ incubation supported the hypothesis that embryonic development within an adult colony is impossible. To test their theory, researchers placed embryos in 3 areas, (I1) at the base of the chimney, (I2) in a Riftia pachyptila colony and (I3) in an adult colony. Results are presented in the below table with the highest survival and development rate coming from the (I1) and (I2) placements. It is also important to note that although the max temperature directly next to the (I3) incubator was 17°C, temperatures as high as 27°C were recorded 20cm away.

After considering all results, as well as prior studies, it was concluded that the 3 most likely hypotheses are as follows.

 Embryos develop within a Riftia pachyptila colony (often near hydrothermal vents)
 Embryos develop at the base of hydrothermal chimneys
 Embryos enter a state of arrest and float in the abyssal column until a warm environment is found before resuming development (this would allow the dispersal of the species)

Tubes 
The Pompeii worm is known for the tubes that it inhabits. Further research has uncovered that these tubes are unusually stable glycoprotein structures with high sulfur levels. Their construction was originally unknown but it is now hypothesised that the structure is made from a secretion from the epidermis of Alvinella pompejana. The fibril layers of the tubing are layered in a similar manner to plywood with each layer being slightly random. Within these tubes a layer of filamentous and rod-shaped bacteria are present, strangely these same bacteria can be found embedded within the walls of the tubes. It has been assumed that these are the bacteria that live in the worm's tubing, they seem to become trapped when the mucous is secreted. Additionally bacteria have been found to be a source of elemental sulfur which explains the sulfur detected within their tube walls.

Name
Pompeii worms get their name from the Roman city of Pompeii that was destroyed during an eruption of Mount Vesuvius in AD 79. Its family name Alvinellidae and genus name Alvinella both derive from DSV Alvin, the three-person submersible vehicle used during the discovery of hydrothermal vents and their fauna during the late 1970s. The family Alvinellidae contains eight other species, but none matches the Pompeii worm's heat tolerance.

Symbiotic Bacteria
While it is not yet known precisely how the Pompeii worm survives these severe vent conditions, scientists suspect the answer lies in the fleece-like bacteria on the worm's back; this layer may be up to 1 cm thick. The bacteria may possess special proteins, "eurythermal enzymes", providing the bacteria—and by extension the worms—protection from a wide range of temperatures. Studies are hampered by the difficulties of sampling; It is currently quite difficult for Pompeii Worms to survive decompression.

The bacteria are known to live in a mutualistic relationship with A. pompejana, making them both symbiotrophs. The main nutrition for the Pompeii worm is derived from chemosynthetic bacteria, this is why it chooses to live in such intense environments. This is due to the toxic metal levels of hydrothermal vent fluid, a factor chemosynthetic bacteria require. Unfortunately, the low pH, low oxygen levels and aforementioned metals within the fluid create an environment only fit for extremophiles; A. pompejana has physiological traits to assist in combating this but they are not enough. As a result, they have developed a strong relationship with the bacteria. The bacteria detoxify the fluid, this allows the worm to feed and live. Then, as the worm lives it respires, thus giving the bacteria a carbon source to feed upon. As an additional benefit, the bacteria gain shelter and surfaces to multiply upon due to the worm’s tubes.

Study of the Pompeii worm's seemingly life-sustaining bacteria could lead to significant advances in the biochemical, pharmaceutical, textile, paper, and detergent industries.

Behavior
Pompeii worms simultaneously keep their heads (including the gills) in much cooler water while their tails are exposed to hot water. Since their internal temperature has yet to be measured, a Pompeii worm may survive exposure to hot water by dissipating heat through its head to keep its internal temperature within the realm previously known to be compatible with animal survival.

References

External links
 Exploratorium: The worm that boasts the world's hottest lifestyle
 Mission to the Abyss: includes an interactive 3D rendering of a Pompeii worm
 National Geographic article about the Pompeii worm

Terebellida
Thermophiles
Animals living on hydrothermal vents
Animals described in 1980